In college football, 2005 NCAA football bowl games may refer to:

2004–05 NCAA football bowl games, for games played in January 2005 as part of the 2004 season.
2005–06 NCAA football bowl games, for games played in December 2005 as part of the 2005 season.